Daniel "Danny" Williams (born 20 April 1989, in Shrewsbury) is a British judoka.

Judo career
Williams became champion of Great Britain, winning the lightweight division at the British Judo Championships in 2011. The following year he competed in the men's 73 kg event at the 2012 Summer Olympics and was eliminated by Rasul Boqiev in the second round.

He won the gold medal in the 73 kg category at the 2014 Commonwealth Games in Scotland.

References

1989 births
Living people
British male judoka
Olympic judoka of Great Britain
Judoka at the 2012 Summer Olympics
Commonwealth Games gold medallists for England
Commonwealth Games medallists in judo
Judoka at the 2014 Commonwealth Games
Medallists at the 2014 Commonwealth Games